Diana di Cordona (1499 - after 1550) was an Italian noble and courtier. She was the lady-in-waiting to queen Bona of Poland and mistress of Sigismund II Augustus and Cesare I Gonzaga, who later in life went missing and was presumed to be dead in 1550.

References

 J. Besala: Małżeństwa królewskie. Jagiellonowie, Varsovia (2007)

Mistresses of Sigismund II Augustus
1499 births
1550s deaths
16th-century Italian nobility
16th-century Italian women
Polish ladies-in-waiting